Francesco Antonio Triveri, O.F.M. Conv. (1631–1697) was a Roman Catholic prelate who served as Bishop of Melfi e Rapolla (1696–1697) and Bishop of Andria (1692–1696).

Biography
Francesco Antonio Triveri was born in Biella, Italy and ordained a priest in the Order of Friars Minor Conventual. On 21 January 1692, he was appointed during the papacy of Pope Innocent XII as Bishop of Andria. On 27 January 1692, he was consecrated bishop by Marcantonio Barbarigo, Bishop of Corneto e Montefiascone, with Giovan Donato Giannoni Alitto, Bishop of Ruvo, and Pietro Vecchia (bishop), Bishop of Molfetta, with serving as co-consecrators. On 24 September 1696, he was appointed during the papacy of Pope Innocent XII as Bishop of Melfi e Rapolla. He served as Bishop of Melfi e Rapolla until his death in May 1697.

Episcopal succession
While bishop, Triveri was the principal co-consecrator of:
Marcos de Ostos, Archbishop of Salerno (1692); and
Teofilo Testa, Bishop of Tropea (1692).

References

External links and additional sources
 (for Chronology of Bishops) 
 (for Chronology of Bishops) 
 (for Chronology of Bishops) 
 (for Chronology of Bishops) 

17th-century Italian Roman Catholic bishops
Bishops appointed by Pope Innocent XII
1631 births
1697 deaths
People from Biella
Conventual Franciscan bishops